A decree is a legal proclamation, usually issued by a head of state such as the president of a republic, or a monarch (a royal decree), according to certain procedures (usually established in a constitution). It has the force of law. The particular term used for this concept may vary from country to country. The executive orders made by the President of the United States, for example, are decrees (although a decree is not exactly an order).

Decree by jurisdiction

Belgium

In Belgium, a decree is a law of a community or regional parliament, e.g. the Flemish Parliament.

France

The word , literally "decree", is an old legal usage in France and is used to refer to executive orders issued by the French President or Prime Minister. Any such order must not violate the French Constitution or Civil Code, and a party has the right to request an order be annulled in the French Council of State. Orders must be ratified by Parliament before they can be modified into legislative Acts.

Except for the reserve powers of the President (as stated in Art. 16 of the 1958 Constitution, exercised only once so far), the executive can issue decrees in areas that the Constitution grants as the responsibility of Parliament only if a law authorizes it to do so. In other cases, orders are illegal and, should anyone sue for the order's annulment, it would be voided by the Council of State. There exists a procedure for the Prime Minister to issue ordinances in such areas, but this procedure requires Parliament's express consent (see Art 38 of the 1958 Constitution).

Orders issued by the Prime Minister take two forms:
 Orders;
 Orders-in-council, when a statute mandates the advisory consultation of the Council of State.

This would imply that it is the Council of State that makes the decree, whereas the power of decreeing is restricted to the president or prime minister; the role of the administrative sections of the Council is purely advisory.

Decrees may be classified into:
 Regulations, which may be:
 Application decrees, each of which must be specifically authorized by one or more statutes to determine some implementation conditions of this or these statutes; these constitute secondary legislation and are roughly equivalent to British statutory instruments;
 Autonomous regulations, which may be taken only in areas where the Constitution does not impose statute law (passed by the Legislature); these constitute primary legislation;
 Particular measures, such as the nomination of high-level civil servants.

Only the prime minister may issue regulatory or application decrees. Presidential decrees are  generally nominations or exceptional measures where the law mandates a presidential decree, such as the dissolution of the French National Assembly, the calling of new legislative elections, and the grant of the title Marshal of France.

Catholic Church

A decree (Latin: decretum) in the usage of the canon law of the Catholic Church has various meanings. Any papal bull, brief, or motu proprio is a decree inasmuch as these documents are legislative acts of the pope. In this sense, the term is quite ancient. The Roman Congregations were formerly empowered to issue decrees in matters which come under their particular jurisdiction but were forbidden from continuing to do so under Pope Benedict XV in 1917. Each ecclesiastical province and also each diocese may issue decrees in their periodical synods within their sphere of authority.

While in a general sense all documents promulgated by an ecumenical council can be called decrees, in a specific sense some of these documents, as at the Second Vatican Council, were called more precisely constitutions or declarations. 

Canon 29 of the 1983 Code of Canon Law defines general decrees:

Holy See

The Holy See uses decrees from the pope such as  papal bull, papal brief or motu proprio as legislative acts.

Italy 

According to clause 77 of the Italian Constitution,

The effectiveness for sixty days produces the effects immediately, giving rights or expectations whose legal basis was precarious, especially when the conversion law never intervened.

Portugal

In Portugal there are several types of decree issued by the various bodies of sovereignty or by the bodies of self-government of autonomous regions.

 there are the following types of decree:
 Decree-law: is a legislative act issued by the Government of Portugal under its legislative powers defined by Article 198 of the Portuguese Constitution;
 Regional legislative decree: is a regional law, issued by the legislative assembly of an autonomous region, within its powers defined by articles 227 and 233 of the Constitution;
 Decree of the President of the Republic: is a decree issued by the President of Portugal, for the ratification of international treaties, the appointment or dismissal of members of the Government or to exercise other presidential powers defined in the Constitution;
 Decree: is an act issued by the Government of Portugal to approve an international agreement whose approval is not within the competence of the Assembly of the Republic or has not been submitted to it or within the Government administrative jurisdiction laid down in Article 199 of the Constitution in relation to a statute that requires this decree;
 Regulatory decree: is an act issued by the Government of Portugal, under its administrative jurisdiction laid down in Article 199 of the Constitution, to make the necessary regulations for the proper execution of the laws and to take all actions and decisions necessary to promote economic and social development and to meet the community needs;
 Regional regulatory decree: is an act issued by the legislature or the government of an autonomous region, regulating the proper implementation of regional legislative decrees;
 A decree from the representative of the Republic: is the decree of appointment or removal of members of the government of an autonomous region, issued by the representative of the Republic for that region.

Iran

According to article 110 of the constitution, the Supreme Leader delineates the general policies of the Islamic Republic.

Russia

Both terms are usually translated as 'decree'.

Such an  has the force of law, but may not alter the Russian constitution or the regulations of existing laws, and may be superseded by laws passed by the Federal Assembly.

The Government of Russia can also issue decrees formally called Decisions (  or Orders and may not contradict the constitution/laws or presidential decrees.

Saudi Arabia
Royal decrees are the source of law in Saudi Arabia.

Spain
In Spain, decrees come in several forms:
 Royal decree
 Royal Decree-Law
 Royal Legislative Decree

Turkey 

In accordance with Article 107 of the 1982 Constitution. One of the important amendments made in the constitution with the act no. 6771 is related to decrees of the presidency.

United Kingdom 

In the United Kingdom, Orders-in-Council are either primary legislation deriving their authority from the Royal Prerogative, promulgated by the Privy Council in the name of the Monarch; or secondary legislation, promulgated by a Minister of the Crown using the authority granted by an Act of Parliament or other primary legislation. Both are subject to judicial review, the former with some exceptions.

United States

In US legal usage, during the 19th and early 20th centuries, a decree was an order of a court of equity determining the rights of the parties to a suit, according to equity and good conscience. Since the 1938 procedural merger of law and equity in the federal courts under the Federal Rules of Civil Procedure, the term judgment (the parallel term in the common law) has generally replaced decree. This is now true also in most state courts. The term decree is broadly treated as synonymous with judgment.

A decree is often a final determination, but there are also interlocutory decrees. A final decree fully and finally disposes of the whole litigation, determining all questions raised by the case, and it leaves nothing that requires further judicial action; it is also appealable. An interlocutory decree is a provisional or preliminary decree that is not final and does not fully determine the suit, so that some further proceedings are required before entry of a final decree. It is usually not appealable, although preliminary injunctions by federal courts are appealable even though interlocutory.

Executive orders, which are instructions from the President to the executive branch of government, are decrees in the general sense in that they have the force of law, although they cannot override statute law or the Constitution and are subject to judicial review. Governors of individual states may also issue state executive orders.

Other uses of the term
In some jurisdictions, certain types of court orders by judges are referred to as decrees, e.g. a divorce decree.

See also
 Consent decree
 Edict
 Fatwa
 Firman
 Official Communications of the Chinese Empire
 Memorial to the throne
 Proclamation
 Rule by decree
 Rescript
 Soviet Decree
 Ukase

Notes

References
 Executive decree authority, John M. Carey and Matthew Soberg Shugart, Eds., Cambridge University Press, 1998,

External links

All external sites in French unless otherwise noted.
 1946 Constitution of the 4th Republic
 1958 Constitution of the 5th Republic

Sources of law